The 2012 ICF Paracanoe World Championships were held on 16 and 17 May 2012 in Poznań, Poland as a standalone event since the ICF Canoe Sprint World Championships are not held in Olympic years.

Explanation of events
Paracanoe competitions are contested in either a va'a (V), an outrigger canoe (which includes a second pontoon) with a single-blade paddle, or in a kayak (K), a closed canoe with a double-bladed paddle. All international competitions are held over 200 metres in single-man boats, with three event classes in both types of vessel for men and women depending on the level of an athlete's impairment; these being A (use of arms only), TA (use of trunk and arms), and LTA (use of legs, trunk, and arms).

Medal summary

Medal table

Medal events

References

External links
Official results site

ICF Canoe Sprint World Championships
ICF Paracanoe World Championships
ICF Paracanoe World Championships
2012 ICF Paracanoe World Championships
2012 ICF Paracanoe World Championships
May 2012 sports events in Europe
Sport in Poznań